This is a list of buildings designed in whole or in part by architect William Pereira. They are listed by year and grouped into the three firms that Pereira belonged to. The first firm listed was based in Chicago, and the rest were in Los Angeles.

Holabird & Root / William L. Pereira

1931
 Armour & Company Exhibit Building, Chicago
 Armour & Company Exhibit Building, San Francisco
 Armour & Company Exhibit Building, New York City
 Elgin Watch Company Industrial Plant, Chicago

1938
 Lake County Tuberculosis Sanatorium, Waukegan, Illinois

1943
 Pan Pacific Theatre, Los Angeles

1945 

 Palms Theatre, Phoenix, Arizona (with Lescher & Mahoney) (demolished)

1950
 Lake County General Hospital, Hobbs, New Mexico

Pereira & Luckman
(partnership with Charles Luckman)

1951
 Farmers & Stockmen's Bank, Phoenix, Arizona
 Gibraltar Savings and Loan Headquarters, 9111 Wilshire Boulevard, Beverly Hills, California
 Robinson's department store, Beverly Hills (demolished)
 Robinson's department store (now Target), 777 E. Colorado Blvd, Pasadena, California

1952
 Avco Research Center, Wilmington, Massachusetts
 Beverly Hills Hotel Addition, Beverly Hills
 Doheny Office Building, Beverly Hills
 Hilton Hotels headquarters, Beverly Hills
 Lear Industrial plant, Santa Monica
 Luke Air Force Base, Phoenix, Arizona

1953

 CBS Television City, Los Angeles
 Western Hydraulics plant, Van Nuys, California

1954

 Electronics and Radio Propagation Research Laboratories, Camp Pendleton, Oceanside, California
 KEYT Television Station, Santa Barbara, California
 KTTV Television Station, Los Angeles (At the time, KTTV was headquartered at Metromedia Square, which has been demolished. Pereira project details are uncertain.)
 National Bureau of Standards building, Boulder, Colorado
 Santa Rosa Hall – Dormitory, University of California, Santa Barbara
 United States Navy training facility, San Diego, California
 Wadsworth General Hospital, Veteran's Administration, Los Angeles
 Western Hydraulics Plant 2, Van Nuys, California
 William H. Block Department Store, Indianapolis
 WSBT Television Station, South Bend, Indiana
 Marineland of the Pacific, Rancho Palos Verdes, California

1955
 Dormitories, Music and Science Buildings, Occidental College, Los Angeles
 Jet Production and Test Center, Palmdale, California
 Service Bureau Office Building, Los Angeles

1956

 Fallbrook Hospital, Fallbrook, California
 General Telephone Company Administration Building, Whittier, California
 Hunter Engineering plant, Riverside, California
 Prudential Tower, Boston (early designs)
 Southern California School of Theology, Claremont, California (now Claremont School of Theology)
 United States Air Force and Naval Bases, Cádiz, Spain
 Braniff International Airways, Operations and Maintenance Base, Dallas, Texas

1957
 First National Bank, Denver, Colorado
 Motion Picture Country House and Hospital, Woodland Hills, California
 Nellis Air Force Base buildings, Nevada

1958

 Beckman Corporation plant, Newport Beach, California
 Berlin Hilton, Berlin, Germany
 Bullock's Fashion Square, Santa Ana, California (partially demolished, now Westfield MainPlace)
 Chrysler Sales & Service Training Center, Anaheim, California
 Convair Astronautics, San Diego, California
 Disneyland Hotel
 Firestone Tire company headquarters, Los Angeles
 Ford Aeronutronics, Newport Beach, California (demolished)
 General Atomic, La Jolla, California
 Grossmont Hospital, San Diego, California
 IBM headquarters, Los Angeles
 Los Angeles International Airport
 Physical Plant Building B, University of Southern California
 Robinson's department store, Palm Springs, California
 Signal Oil headquarters, Los Angeles
 Union Oil Center, Los Angeles (now Los Angeles Center Studios)
 Valley Presbyterian Hospital, Van Nuys, California

William L. Pereira & Associates

1959

 Automation Post Office, Washington, D.C.
 Carthay Circle Theatre, Hollywood
 Civic Center, Santa Fe Springs, California
 Firestone Aeronautical Research Laboratory, Caltech campus
Fox Theatre, San Francisco
 Hoffman Science Center, Santa Barbara, California
 Hollywood Motion Picture and Television Museum (unbuilt)
 Lear Corporation, Goleta, California
 Linda Island homes, Newport Beach, California
 Los Angeles Zoo
 Prudential Savings and Loan building, Salt Lake City
Rosenweig Commercial Center, Phoenix, Arizona
 San Diego International Airport
 Vogue Theatre, Hollywood

1960
 Biltmore Hotel, Santa Barbara, California
 Children's Theatre Arts Center, Los Angeles
 Communications School and Recreation Complex, Loyola University, Los Angeles
 Del E. Webb residence, Mission Bay, California
 Ford Aeronutronics, Newport Beach, California (demolished 1996)
 Fox Hills Home Savings and Loan, Fox Hills, California
 General Atomics headquarters, Sorrento Valley, California
 General Telephone Research Laboratories, Palo Alto, California
 Otis College of Art & Design, Los Angeles

1961
 Library, Santa Fe Springs, California
 Physical Sciences Building, University of Southern California
 Prudential Savings and Loan #2, Salt Lake City

1962
 Hunt Branch Library, Fullerton, California
 Prudential Savings and Loan, 49 N Main Street, Butte, Montana

1963
 Columbia Records pressing plant, Santa Maria, California
 Continental Savings and Loan, Montebello, California
 Gene Donovan residence, Salt Lake City
 Gibraltar Savings and Loan, San Marino, California
 Metropolitan Water District building, Victor Heights, Los Angeles
 Olin Hall of Engineering, University of Southern California
 Otis Chandler residence, San Marino, California
 Union Bank, Pasadena, California
 Ventura Bank and Office Building, 250 S. Mills Road, Ventura, California
 West Covina Country Club and Apartments, West Covina, California

1964
 ABC Paramount Theatres headquarters, Los Angeles
 Ahmanson Center for Biological Research, University of Southern California
 Art Building, Occidental College, Los Angeles
 Arthur Coons Center, Occidental College, Los Angeles
 Beacon Street Apartments, Santa Catalina Island, California
 Clementine Avenue Townhouses, Santa Catalina Island, California
 David Bright residence
 Descanso Canyon Hotel, Santa Catalina Island, California
 Douglas Aircraft Research Laboratory, Huntington Beach, California (demolished 2021)
 Gibraltar Savings and Loan, Baldwin Hills, California
 Harris Fine Arts Center, Brigham Young University Provo, Utah
 International Motion Pictures studio, San Juan, Puerto Rico
 Laguna Playhouse, Laguna Beach, California
 Union Bank, Fullerton, California
 Prudential Federal Savings, Salt Lake City, Utah

1965

 AT&T Center, Los Angeles (previously headquarters for the Transamerica Corporation)
 Avalon Townhouses, Santa Catalina Island, California
 Bank of California, Orange, California
 Civic Center, San Dimas, California
 Communications Building, Los Angeles City College
 Community Building, Santa Fe Springs, California
 Cord Residence, Reno, Nevada
 Dickson Art Center, University of California, Los Angeles
 Ferris Rehearsal Hall, University of Southern California
 Gildread Theatre, Mexico City
 Golden West College, Huntington Beach, California
 Harris Fine Arts Center, Brigham Young University, Provo, Utah
 Howard Johnson Plaza Hotel, Anaheim, California
 Hotel Ivoire, Abidjan, Côte d'Ivoire
 International Clubs headquarters, Los Angeles
 Los Angeles County Museum of Art (demolished 2020)
 Pepsi plant, Santa Ana, California
 University of California, Irvine campus (infrastructure, campus layout, and early buildings)
 Central Plant
 Crawford Hall
 Gateway Study Center 
 Humanities Hall
 Murray Krieger Hall
 Jack Langson Library
 Mesa Court (phase 1)
 Howard A. Schneiderman Lecture Hall
 Edward A. Steinhaus Hall
 Unocal 76 gas station, Beverly Hills, California (designed by Gin Wong)

1966
 John Stauffer Hall of Science, University of Southern California
 North American Aviation, Santa Catalina Island, California
 Robertson Plaza, Beverly Hills, California
 Seaquarium, Atlantic City, New Jersey
 Wilshire County Country Club, Los Angeles

1967

 400 Tower, Newport Center, Newport Beach, California
 611 Place, Los Angeles
 City Hall, Miami, Florida
 Civic Center, Newport Beach, California
 Council Chamber and City Hall, Cypress, California 
 Eddie Martin Terminal, John Wayne Airport, Santa Ana, California (demolished 1994)
 Fine Arts Building, University of Vermont
 Fort St. Vrain Nuclear Power Plant, Denver, Colorado
 Fremont Junior College
 Hall of Science, University of Southern California
 Hoffman Electronics headquarters, Santa Barbara, California
 Hollywood Communications Center, Hollywood
 Horticulture Building and Greenhouse, University of California, Irvine
 Litton Industries headquarters, Santa Catalina Island, California
 Rio de Janeiro International Airport, Brazil
 Robinson's, Fashion Island, Newport Beach, California
 Robinson's, La Cumbre Plaza, Santa Barbara, California
 Tunis Airport, Tunisia
 United States Navy Defense Office Complex, Washington, D.C.
 USC Marine Science Center, Santa Catalina Island, California
 Vivian Hall, University of Southern California
 William Pereira's own house, Los Angeles
 World Airways Terminal, Los Angeles International Airport

1968

 American Red Cross Chapel, Los Angeles
 Anderson Hills Shopping Center, Williams, California
 Bethany Heights Condominiums
 Don Muang Airport, Thailand
 Geneva Presbyterian Church, Laguna Hills, California
 Kona Bishop Hotel, Kona, Hawaii
 Law Building, University of Southern California
 Lockheed Power Plant, Palmdale, California
 Occidental Life Insurance Company headquarters, Los Angeles
 Rye Canyon Science Laboratory, Palmdale, California
 Santa Ana Cinema, Santa Ana, California
 New England Center, University of New Hampshire

1969

 500/550 Twin Towers, Newport Center, Newport Beach, California
 Amfac Center, Ontario, Canada
 Buena Park Library, Buena Park, California
 Bunker Hill Towers, Los Angeles
 Camp Pendleton Hospital, Camp Pendleton, California
 Great Western Savings and Loan, Los Angeles
 H.S. Pogue Department Store, Cincinnati, Ohio
 JC Penney, San Diego
 Robinson's Department Store, Fashion Valley Mall, San Diego, California
 Mutual Benefit Life Building, Cincinnati, Ohio
 Pan Am Terminal, Honolulu International Airport
 San Nicolas Place, Newport Center, Newport Beach, California
 Seaver Science Center, University of Southern California

1970

 Civic Center and Auditorium, Inglewood, California
 Fine Arts Complex, University of California, Irvine (now the Claire Trevor School of the Arts)
 Art Studios
 Music Building
 Art Gallery (now the Beall Center for Art and Technology)
 Drama Building
 Sculpture and Ceramic Studios (now the Nixon Theatre)
 Orchestra Rehearsal Hall
 Production Studio
 Concert Hall (now Winifred Smith Hall)
 Studio Theatre
 Village Theatre (now the Claire Trevor Theatre)
 Geisel Library, University of California, San Diego
 Hollywood Park Hotel and Office Complex, Hollywood
 J.C. Penney, Sacramento, California
 J.C. Penney, Honolulu, Hawaii
 J.C. Penney, San Bernardino, California
 New England Center, University of New Hampshire, Durham
 Scripps Clinic, San Diego
 Studio Theatre, Kennedy Center, Washington, D.C.
 St. Vincent's Hospital, Santa Fe, New Mexico
 Texas Industrial Laundries, Corpus Christi

1971

 5900 Wilshire Tower, Los Angeles (designed by Gin Wong)
 Bank of America, Whittier, California
 Eastern Airlines Terminal, Atlanta International Airport
 Harbor Justice Center, Irvine, California
 Hawaii Loa College, Oahu, Hawaii
 Library, University of Cincinnati
 Newport Medical Towers, Newport Center, Newport Beach, California
 Rockwell Autonetics, Laguna Niguel, California (now Chet Holifield Federal Building)
 Social Security Administration Center, San Francisco
 Two Houston Center, Houston, Texas

1972

 Bob Hope residence, Burbank, California
 The Broadway, Santa Anita, California
 The Broadway, Fox Hills, California
 Citibank, Albany, New York
 Citibank, Rochester, New York
 Citibank, Smith Grove, New York
 Citibank, Syracuse, New York
 Civic Center, Aurora, Illinois
 Conference Center and Housing Complex, Lagos, Nigeria
 Convention Center, Columbus, Ohio
 Desert Hospital, Palm Springs, California
 Eastmont Mall, Oakland, California
 Grand Slam Health Club, Costa Mesa, California
 Great Western Financial Corporation, 8484 Wilshire, Beverly Hills (now called the Flynt Building)
 Gulf Mall, Panama City, Florida
 Hillcrest Hospital, Petaluma, California
 Honolulu Medical Complex, Honolulu, Hawaii
 Hospital, University of Southern California
 Leleiwe Beach Hotel, Hilo, Hawaii
 Marriott Hotel, Bermuda
 Mauna Loa Shores Apartments, Hawaii
 Pacific Life building, Newport Center, Newport Beach, California
 Reno International Airport, Reno, Nevada
 San Francisco International Airport
 Sears Shopping Center, La Puerte, California
 Shuttle Terminal, La Guardia Airport, New York City
 Tehran International Airport, Tehran, Iran
 Transamerica Pyramid, San Francisco
 United California Bank, San Mateo, California
 Vacia Talega Hotel and Condominiums, Puerto Rico
 Westin St. Francis Hotel, San Francisco

1973

 Beverly Hills Medical Building, Beverly Hills
 Charles Lee Powell Hall, University of Southern California
 Bayou Building, University of Houston at Clear Lake City
 Communications Building, Los Angeles City College
 Continental Airlines First Class Lounge, Los Angeles International Airport
 Eisenhower Center, Washington, D.C.
 First Hawaiian Bank Building, Honolulu
 Greyhound Bus Terminal, Reno, Nevada
 Harrisburg International Airport, Harrisburg, Pennsylvania
 Hartsfield Airport, Atlanta, Georgia
 Hawaii Kai Studio, Honolulu
 Makaha Towers and Country Club, Makaha, Hawaii
 Metropolitan Water District building (The Elysian), Victor Heights, Los Angeles
 Naval Base, New Orleans, Louisiana
 Pacific Financial Center, Los Angeles
 Phillips Theme Tower, Pepperdine University
 Regent Beach Hotel, Pattaya, Thailand
 Riverside Administration Building, Riverside, California
 Security Pacific National Bank, Oakland, California
 Wilshire Regent Hotel, Los Angeles
 Wells Fargo Bank, Newport Center, Newport Beach, California

1974

 450 Tower, Newport Center, Newport Beach, California
 660 Tower, Newport Center, Newport Beach, California
 California State Capitol Building Addition, Sacramento, California
 Central Post Office, La Habra, California
 City Hall Annex, Cypress, California
 Continental Hotel, Guam
 Convention Center, Palm Springs, California
 Crocker Citizen's Bank, San Francisco
 Hilton Hotel, Kuta, Bali
 Hoag Hospital West Tower, Newport Beach, California
 Imperial Medical Center, Tehran, Iran (now called Iran University of Medical Sciences)
 Kauai Inn and Conference Center, Hawaii
 Library, Cypress, California
 Medical and Dental Clinic, San Diego Naval Training Center
 Middle Earth Housing, University of California, Irvine (phase 1)
 Naval Hospital, Port Hueneme, California
 Naval Hospital, San Diego, California
 Pacific Mutual Building, San Francisco
 Quail Springs Mall, Oklahoma City, Oklahoma
 Staten Island Hospital, New York City
 Virginia Ramo Hall of Music, University of Southern California

1975

 Albert S. Raubenheimer Music Building, University of Southern California
 Frank Hagel Social Security Building, Richmond, California
 Marriott Hotel, Newport Center, Newport Beach, California
 Satellite Building 2, Los Angeles International Airport

1976

 Barstow Community College, Barstow, California
 Bell Operations Training Facility, Tehran, Iran
 Bing Theatre, University of Southern California
 Biology Building, Caltech campus
 Computer Science Center, University of Southern California
 Harrah's, Reno, Nevada
 Jet Propulsion Laboratory, Pasadena, California
 Los Angeles Trade Tech Library, Los Angeles
 Professional Office Building, Glendale, California
 Stanford Research Institute, Menlo Park, California

1977

 Arizona State Prison, Florence, Arizona
 Armed Services Headquarters, Jakarta, Indonesia
 Boise Industrial Park, Boise, Idaho
 Braille Institute, Los Angeles, California
 Cerritos Cultural Center, Cerritos, California
 Convention Center, San Francisco
 County Government Center, San Bernardino, California
 Douglas Aircraft Plaza, Irvine, California
 Federal Correctional Facility, Camarillo, California
 Gaylord Apartments, Las Vegas, Nevada
 Horrock's, Baton Rouge, Louisiana
 Hyatt Hotel, Kuwait
 Intevep Laboratories, Caracas, Venezuela
 Lake Tahoe Community College, Lake Tahoe, California
 Maricopa Jail, Maricopa, California
 National Steinbeck Center, Salinas, California
 Produce Market, Los Angeles
 Prudential Office Building, Costa Mesa, California (now California Bank & Trust)
 South Coast Town Center, Costa Mesa, California (heavily altered)
 Toyota Headquarters, Torrance, California
 Warner Bros. Office Building, Burbank, California

1978

 American Airlines Corporate Headquarters, Los Angeles International Airport
 Baghdad International Airport (formerly Saddam International Airport), Baghdad, Iraq
 Host International Headquarters, Los Angeles
 Los Angeles Times, Northridge, California
 Los Angeles Times, Costa Mesa, California
 Raley's Landing, Sacramento, California

1979

 Hydrocarbon Institute, University of Southern California

1980

 Communicore, EPCOT Center, Walt Disney World Resort, Lake Buena Vista, Florida
 Pontiac Office Tower, Singapore
 Two Transamerica Center, San Francisco
 Yanbu Residential Community, Yanbu, Saudi Arabia

1981

 Jonathan Club, Los Angeles
 Universal City Sheraton Hotel, Burbank, California

1982

 Doha Sheraton Hotel, Doha, Qatar
 Nob Hill Condominiums, San Francisco
 Park La Brea, Los Angeles
 Performing Arts Center, Whittier, California

1983

 Lockheed headquarters, Calabasas, California
 Park Wellington Condominiums, Los Angeles
 T-2 Information Systems, Carlsbad, California
 Irvine Hall, University of California, Irvine

1984 

 One Sansome Street, San Francisco

1985 

 Fox Plaza, Century City, Los Angeles (with Scott Johnson and Bill Fain)

References

External links

Pereira
Pereira
Pereira
Pereira
Pereira